Rhytiphora saundersi is a species of beetle in the family Cerambycidae. It was described by Francis Polkinghorne Pascoe in 1857. It is known from Australia. It contains the varietas Rhytiphora saundersi var. spenceri.

References

saundersi
Beetles described in 1857